Nancy Kelly is a jazz singer known for blues, swing, and bebop music.

Biography 
Kelly was born October 12, 1950 in Rochester, New York and began studying music at the age of four. She studied voice at the Eastman School of Music and studied piano, clarinet, drama and dance with private instructors. She gravitated to jazz because of the freedom to improvise and then formed her own group.

Career 
Nancy has performed with:

 The Nelson Riddle Orchestra
 The Benny Goodman Orchestra
 Houston Person
 Harry Allen
 Joey Defrancesco
 Mark Murphy
 Clayton Cameron
 Eric Reed
 Tamir Hendelman
 Randy Brecker

Nancy has shared billing with:

 Dizzy Gillespie
 Chick Corea
 Little Jimmy Scott
 Dianne Reeves
 New York Voices
 George Benson
 World Saxophone Quartet
 Terry Gibbs
 Eddie Gomez
 Dave Brubeck
 McCoy Tyner
 Diane Schuur
 Roberta Flack
 Michael McDonald

In 2007 Kelly was honored to take part in the Visiting Songbirds Series along with Nancy King and Rebecca Parris at Bake's Place in Washington State.

Discography 

1988  Live Jazz (Amherst)
1997  Singin’ & Swingin’ (Amherst)
2006  Born to Swing (Amherst)
2009  Well, Alright! (Saying It With Jazz)
2014  B That Way (Bluebay)
2019  Remembering Mark Murphy (SubCat)
2022 Jazz Woman (SubCat)

Awards and honors 
 2020 Rochester Hall of Fame 
 2018 Jazz N Caz Award
 Unsung Heroine Award ... for achievements in music National Organization of Women
"Best Female Jazz Vocalist” in the Downbeat Reader's Poll in two separate years
Syracuse Area Music (SAMMY) Awards - Syracuse, New York :

References

External links 

Nancy Kelly Website

1950 births
Living people
American women jazz singers
American jazz singers
21st-century American women singers
21st-century American singers